Patrick Molefe Shai (9 December 1956 – 22 January 2022) was a South African actor and director. He was best known for the roles in the television series and shows Soul City, Generations, Zone 14, Ashes to Ashes, and Zero Tolerance. He was one of the founding members of Free Film Makers of South Africa.

Personal life

During a protest in Dobsonville due to electricity cuts, he was wounded by 11 rubber bullets and rushed to Tshepo Themba Hospital. He was shot in the neck, back, leg, and arms. After the incident, he opened a complaint against police with the Independent Police Investigative Directorate (Ipid) for the brutal activity of the police.

Shai was married to Mmasechaba Shai, and together they had two children. He committed suicide in Dobsonville on 22 January 2022.

Career

He started career as a dancer at Safari Ranch with Mzumba African Drama and Ballet. In 1994, he joined with the cast of drama serial Soul City, for which he won the Avanti Trophy for Best Actor at the NTVA Avanti Awards in 2000. In 1995, he wrote and acted in the film Hearts & Minds by playing the role "Mathews Kage". He later won the Silver Dolphin Award for Best Screenplay at the Festróia - Tróia International Film Festival. In 1996, he also played the role of "Christmas" in the 1996 BBC mini-series Rhodes.

For his role as "Enoch Molope" in the 2004 television serial Zero Tolerance, he was nominated for the SAFTA Golden Horn	Award for Best Actor in TV Drama category at the South African Film and Television Awards (SAFTA). In 2005, he joined with the SABC2 mini-series Noah's Arc and nominated for the SAFTA Golden Horn for Best Actor at 2010 SAFTA. In 2008, he acted in the SABC2 sitcom Moferefere Lenyalon and played the lead role of "Kgosi Matlakala". After that, in 2010, he played the role "Bra Sporo" in the SABC2 drama series Hola Mpinji and as "Tiger Sibiya" for the third season of the SABC1 drama series Zone 14. At the 2014 SAFTA, he was nominated for the Best Supporting Actor Award for his role in the serial Skeem Saam. In 2017, Shai joined with the cast of popular SABC2 soap opera 7de Laan and played the role "Jacob Moloi". For his role, he was again nominated for the SAFTA Golden Horn Award for Best Supporting Actor at the SAFTA 2018.

Filmography

References

External links
 

1956 births
2022 deaths
2022 suicides
20th-century South African male actors
21st-century South African male actors
Male actors from Johannesburg
South African male film actors
South African male television actors
Suicides in South Africa